A Fighter's Blues is a 2000 Hong Kong drama film written and directed by Daniel Lee, produced by and starring Andy Lau. Lau, who displays profound emotions as a kickboxer who persistently pursues dignity and honorary value in the film, was awarded the Golden Bauhinia Awards for Best Actor for his performance. Released on 21 December 2000, A Fighter's Blues is Lau's 100th film role.

Plot
After spending 13 years in jail for killing one of his opponents Chat Chai in the dressing room after breaking up the fight because of a quarrel with his girlfriend Pim, Mong Fu (Andy Lau), a washed up Muay Thai kickboxer returns to Thailand to look for his old love. Upon arrival in Bangkok, he finds out that she died and that he has a 14-year-old daughter. He finds the orphanage and meets his daughter and starts a relationship with sister Mioko who runs the orphanage. To clean his past, he challenges the current and more than 15 years younger champion, who wants to avenge Chai.

Cast
 Andy Lau as Mong Fu
 Takako Tokiwa as Sister Mioko
 Intira Jaroenpura as Pim Nathasiri
 Dickens Chan as Mong Fu's coach
 Chan Man-yee
 Venus Keung
 Kam Loi-kwan as Mong Fu's cornerman
 Kowit Wattanakui as Sombat
 Samart Payakaroon as Chart-Chai Payakaroon (mistakenly credited as "Samart Tayakaroon")
 Apichaya Thanatthanapong as Ploy
 Niruj Soasudchart as Tawon
 Ekachai Waritchaaporn as Ray
 Peemachai Pengphol as Popeye
 Sagat Porntavee as Sagat
 Manunya Limsatain as Moon
 Chaleampan Junthong as Ann
 Bismillah Nana as May
 Thapakorn Maungkrang as Little boxer
 Juthaimas Changthong as Prae
 Gunyarat Maunboon as Jane
 Nutvara Hongsuwan as Alice
 Sirinthorn Kittisrisawai as White
 Natalie Stybert as Natalie
 Suchai Tigitnalerd as Thai commentator
 Philip Wilson as Ray's coach
 Visapas Puemsuotavee as Eagle
 Suwat Sfechompoo as Somar
 Nizondh Chaisirikul as Somar's coach
 Stephen Fox as Commentator
 Suchao Pongvilai as General
 Kowit Butrachart as Carlos
 Aroon Lam as Master Lui
 Kwok Siu-hang as Mong Fu's cornerman
 Reila Aphrodite

Reception

A Fighter's Blues was a box office success in Hong Kong, grossing HK$22,002,055 during its theatrical run from 21 December 2000 to 31 January 2001, making it the third-highest-grossing film of 2000 in the territory.

The film received mixed reviews and has a score of 56 out of 100 on Rotten Tomatoes, but was praised for the beautiful locations in Thailand, use of flashbacks, the acting of the main cast, and the editing of the fight scenes.

Andy Lau trained extensively in Muay Thai for his role as Mong Fu.

Soundtrack

Theme song
 When I Met You (當我遇上你)
 Composer: Jacky Chan
 Lyricist/Singer: Andy Lau

Sub theme
 Smile (微笑)
 Composer: Henry Lai Wan-man
 Lyricist/Singer: Andy Lau

Accolades

References

External links
 

2000 films
2000 martial arts films
2000s sports drama films
2000 romantic drama films
Hong Kong martial arts films
Hong Kong sports drama films
Martial arts tournament films
Hong Kong boxing films
Muay Thai films
2000s Cantonese-language films
China Star Entertainment Group films
Films produced by Andy Lau
Films directed by Daniel Lee
Films about sportspeople
Films set in Bangkok
Films shot in Bangkok
2000s Hong Kong films